Oak Orchard, also known as Oak Orchard on-the-Ridge, is a hamlet in the town of Ridgeway in Orleans County, New York, United States.

The Cobblestone Inn was listed on the National Register of Historic Places in 2007.

References

Hamlets in New York (state)
Hamlets in Orleans County, New York